Battle of Mackinac may refer to:
 Siege of Fort Mackinac, a battle in 1812 during the War of 1812
 Battle of Mackinac Island, a battle in 1814 during the War of 1812